HMAS Protector (ASR 241) was a Royal Australian Navy (RAN) trials and submarine rescue ship. Built in 1984, the ship was initially operated by the National Safety Council of Australia as MV Blue Nabilla. She was purchased by the RAN in 1990 for use as a surveillance, training, and diving support vessel. During her military career, Protector supported the trials of the s, and was involved in a search for the shipwreck of the World War II cruiser . The ship was decommissioned in 1998 and, while still owned by the Commonwealth, she is provided to Defence Maritime Services to allow them to support Navy activities under contract.

Construction
The ship was constructed by Stirling Marine Services in Western Australia, and was completed in 1984.

Operational history
She operated as MV Blue Nabilla for the National Safety Council of Australia until 1990.

The ship was purchased by the RAN on 18 October 1990, fitted with a LIPS dynamic positioning system, two Remotely Operated Vehicles and a recompression chamber. She was commissioned as HMAS Protector in November 1990. She supported the  trials and acceptance process from 1992. On 10 June 1995, Protector was slightly damaged when a switchboard malfunction aboard  caused the submarine to ram the trials ship. The vessel also performed in the surveillance, training, and diving support roles.

During 1997, Protector undertook a brief and unsuccessful search for the remains of the World War II cruiser .

When Protector was decommissioned in 1998, she was provided to the RAN's support craft contractor, Defence Maritime Services, for use in the provision of Fleet and training support operating out of  under the name Seahorse Horizon. In 2002, Seahorse Horizon took part in Exercise Dugong, laying and recovering mines.

In May 2018 Seahorse Horizon was put up for sale to the public by the Commonwealth.

References

External links

Auxiliary ships of the Royal Australian Navy
Training ships of the Royal Australian Navy
1984 ships
Ships built in Western Australia